The America Zone was one of the three regional zones of the 1960 Davis Cup.

6 teams entered the America Zone, with 3 teams each competing in the North & Central America Zone and South America Zone. The winner of each sub-zone would play against each other to determine who moved to the Inter-Zonal Zone to compete against the winners of the Eastern Zone and Europe Zone.

The United States defeated Mexico in the North & Central America Zone final, and Venezuela defeated New Zealand in the South America Zone final. In the Americas Inter-Zonal Final, the United States defeated Venezuela and progressed to the Inter-Zonal Zone.

North & Central America Zone

Draw

Semifinals

Canada vs. United States

Final

Mexico vs. United States

South America Zone

Draw

Semifinals

Caribbean/West Indies vs. New Zealand

Final

Venezuela vs. New Zealand

Americas Inter-Zonal Final

United States vs. Venezuela

References

External links
Davis Cup official website

Davis Cup Americas Zone
America Zone
Davis Cup